Urophorus is a genus of sap-feeding beetles in the family Nitidulidae. There are at least two described species in Urophorus.

Species
These two species belong to the genus Urophorus:
 Urophorus humeralis (Fabricius, 1798) (pineapple beetle)
 Urophorus yakushenkoi Audisio & Kirejtshuk, 1989

References

Further reading

External links

 

Nitidulidae
Articles created by Qbugbot